Une Femme ou Deux (English: One Woman or Two) is a French screwball comedy romance film released in 1985. It stars Gérard Depardieu, Sigourney Weaver, and Dr. Ruth Westheimer.

Plot
Shy paleontologist/archaeologist (Gérard Depardieu) makes an archeological find of the fossil remains of the first, two-million-year-old, French woman, whom he calls Laura. He is approached and conned by a crass and greedy American model and Madison Avenue advertising executive (Sigourney Weaver), masquerading as a charity organisation executive in order to use the woman for her own perfume advertising campaign.  

Later the real charity organisation executive, ditzy rich American patroness of the sciences (Ruth Westheimer; Dr. Ruth, in her feature film debut) turns up ... it all develops from there.

The movie is noted as a rework of the American 1938 classic screwball comedy Bringing Up Baby, starring Katharine Hepburn and Cary Grant.

Cast
 Gérard Depardieu: Julien Chayssac
 Sigourney Weaver: Jessica Fitzgerald
 Dr. Ruth Westheimer: Mrs. Heffner
 Michel Aumont: Pierre Carrière
 Zabou Breitman: Constance Michaux
 Tannis Vallely: Zoé

Sigourney Weaver and Dr. Ruth speak most of their dialogue in French.

Production
The film was shot in France (much of it in Paris) and New York City. French paleontologist Yves Coppens advised on the film.

Release
It was released in the U.S. under the name One Woman or Two, the literal English language translation of its French language title.

Reviews
Chicago Sun-Times reviewer Roger Ebert wrote of this film in a half star review, "Add it all up, and what you've got here is a waste of good electricity. I'm not talking about the electricity between the actors. I'm talking about the current to the projector." In 2005 he included it on his most-hated films list.

Richard Harrington writing for The Washington Post said: "it's funny enough, and genial in the way French comedy tends to be." 

Frederic and Mary Ann Brussat, writing for Spirituality & Practice, rated it 3 out of 5, saying the film "abounds in zany situations" and "offers plenty of chuckles."

References

External links
 
 Timeout film guide 13!
 

1985 comedy films
1980s French-language films
1980s screwball comedy films
1985 films
1985 romantic comedy films
French romantic comedy films
Films set in France
Films shot in France
Films set in New York City
Films shot in New York City
1980s French films